Licang is an urban district (区) of Qingdao in the Chinese province of Shandong. It has an area of 95.52 km2 and around 589,200 inhabitants as of 2019. The district hosted the main grounds for the International Horticultural Expo in 2014.

Administrative divisions
As 2012, this district is divided to 11 subdistricts.
Subdistricts

References

External links 
 Information page

Geography of Qingdao
County-level divisions of Shandong
Districts of China